Chêne-Bourg railway station is a railway station in the municipality of Chêne-Bourg, in the Swiss canton of Geneva. It is an intermediate stop on the standard gauge CEVA orbital railway line of Swiss Federal Railways.

History 
The station building was preserved, and re-opened from 2011–2013 to handle TER services after construction on the new CEVA orbital railway line led to the closure of Genève-Eaux-Vives.

As part of the CEVA project, a new underground station was built at Chêne-Bourg; the original station building was moved about  but remains standing. The new station opened on 15 December 2019.

Services 
The following services stop at Chêne-Bourg:

Notes

References

External links 
 
 

Railway stations in Switzerland opened in 2019
Railway stations in the canton of Geneva
Swiss Federal Railways stations